John Albert Elway Sr. (May 30, 1931 – April 15, 2001) was an American football player and coach. He was the head coach at California State University, Northridge from 1976 to 1978, at San Jose State University from 1979 to 1983, and at Stanford University from 1984 to 1989, compiling a career college football record of 80–60–4.  Elway also served as the head coach for the Frankfurt Galaxy of the World League of American Football (WLAF) from 1991 to 1992, tallying a mark of 10–10.  He is the father of John Elway, Pro Football Hall of Fame quarterback.

Early life
A native of Hoquiam, Washington, Elway played quarterback at Hoquiam High School under head coach Jack Swarthout and graduated in 1949. He played at Washington State College in Pullman for one season until a knee surgery ended his playing career. He earned both bachelor's and master's degrees from Washington State.

Early coaching career
Elway then taught and coached at Port Angeles High School on the Olympic Peninsula; all three of his children were born in Port Angeles.  In 1961, he was hired as the head coach at Grays Harbor College, a junior college in Aberdeen, near his hometown of Hoquiam in southwestern Washington.  Following the 1966 season, he became an assistant coach in the Big Sky Conference at the University of Montana under head coach Swarthout, his high school coach.

After five seasons in Missoula with the Grizzlies, he moved to the Pac-8 at his alma mater following the 1971 season, as an assistant under head coach Jim Sweeney, and stayed in Pullman for four seasons. Sweeney abruptly resigned after the 1975 season and went south to Fresno State, so Elway stayed on the Palouse and joined the staff at neighboring Idaho under head coach Ed Troxel in February 1976. Elway replaced Dennis Erickson, who had joined Sweeney at Fresno in December. Elway didn't stay long as an assistant in Moscow; he left in late March after only five weeks on the Vandals' staff to accept a Division II head coaching position in Southern California.

Head coaching career
In late March 1976, Elway was introduced as the head coach at Cal State Northridge in the San Fernando Valley of Los Angeles. At the time, Elway's son John was a budding high school quarterback, finishing his freshman year at Pullman High School. He transferred to Granada Hills High School at the start of his sophomore year, and his play over the next three football seasons in head coach Jack Neumeier's spread offense invited scores of scholarship offers; he selected Stanford and enrolled in 1979.

After three seasons at Northridge, Jack Elway moved up the California coast (and up to Division I) to San Jose State following the 1978 season, where his first offensive coordinator was Dennis Erickson. They employed the spread offense, which Elway had picked up from Neumeier and then used at Northridge. San Jose State had considerable success, especially against nearby Stanford, where son John was the starting quarterback through the 1982 season. Jack's Spartans won three consecutive games over Stanford from 1981 to 1983, and compiled a  record in five seasons.

After John's graduation, Jack moved the few miles up the peninsula to Stanford in 1984, where he was head coach for five seasons with a  record.  In 1991, he coached the Frankfurt Galaxy of the WLAF during the team's first two years.  Elway then was in the Denver Broncos' scouting department from 1993–99, the last five as director of pro scouting.

Personal life
Elway was married to Jan. They had three children, including NFL Hall of Fame quarterback John Elway, and eight grandchildren. On April 15, 2001, Jack Elway died at age 69, following an apparent heart attack at his home in Palm Springs, California.

He was buried at Sunset Memorial Park in his hometown of Hoquiam, Washington. His younger daughter Jana, twin sister of John, died of lung cancer in 2002 at the age of 42.

Head coaching record

College

Professional

References

1931 births
2001 deaths
Cal State Northridge Matadors football coaches
Coaches of American football from California
Coaches of American football from Washington (state)
Denver Broncos executives
Denver Broncos scouts
Frankfurt Galaxy coaches
Grays Harbor Chokers football coaches
High school football coaches in Washington (state)
Montana Grizzlies football coaches
People from Hoquiam, Washington
People from Port Angeles, Washington
People from the San Fernando Valley
Sportspeople from Los Angeles County, California
Sportspeople from Palm Springs, California
Stanford Cardinal football coaches
Washington State Cougars football coaches